Arthur Houghton may refer to:

 Douglas Houghton, Baron Houghton of Sowerby (Arthur Leslie Noel Douglas Houghton, 1898–1996), British politician
 Arthur Boyd Houghton (1836–1875),British painter and illustrator
 Arthur D. Houghton (1870–1938), medical doctor, botanistand one of the founders of the American Legion
 Arthur A. Houghton Jr. (1906–1990), American industrialist